Neuilly-le-Réal is a commune in the Allier department in Auvergne-Rhône-Alpes in central France.

Population

Culture and Heritage 
 Logis of Henri IV, 16th century.
 Lazarist Farmer General's House, 18th century.
 Church Saint-Julien de Brioude.
 Castle of Frêne (or Fresne), 17th and 19th centuries; Monument Historique since 1 October 2021.

See also
Communes of the Allier department

References

Communes of Allier
Allier communes articles needing translation from French Wikipedia